Pain Pap Kiadeh (also Romanized as Pā’īn Pāp Kīādeh; also known as Pāeenmaḩalleh-ye Pāpīyādeh) is a village in Chaf Rural District, in the Central District of Langarud County, Gilan Province, Iran. At the 2006 census, its population was 562, in 186 families.

References 

Populated places in Langarud County